Ternavka is a village in Stryi Raion, Lviv Oblast in western Ukraine. It is located in the Ukrainian Carpathians, within the Eastern Beskids on the border of Zakarpattia Oblast. Ternavka belongs to Slavske settlement hromada, one of the hromadas of Ukraine.

History 

The first written mention of Ternavka dates from 1597. During World War I, the town's church was damaged as a result of fighting. It was restored in 1921.

Until 18 July 2020, Ternavka belonged to Skole Raion. The raion was abolished in July 2020 as part of the administrative reform of Ukraine, which reduced the number of raions of Lviv Oblast to seven. The area of Skole Raion was merged into Stryi Raion.

References

External links 
 Замки та храми України, Тернавка [Castles and temples of Ukraine, Ternavka] 

Villages in Stryi Raion